This is a timeline documenting events of Jazz in the year 1989.

Events

February
 27 – Woody Shaw was struck by a subway car in Brooklyn, NY, which severed his left arm. By the late 1980s Shaw was suffering from an incurable degenerative eye disease and was losing his eyesight. Details of the accident are unclear.

March
 17 – The 16th Vossajazz started in Voss, Norway (March 17 – 19).

May
 12 – The 18th Moers Festival (May 12 – 15).
 24 – The 17th Nattjazz started in Bergen, Norway (May 24 – June 7).

July
 1 – The 33rd Newport Jazz Festival started in Newport, Rhode Island (July 1 – 3).
 6 – The 23rd Montreux Jazz Festival started in Montreux, Switzerland (July 6 – 21).
 14 – The 14th North Sea Jazz Festival started in The Hague, Netherlands (July 14 – 16).
 28 – The 12th Jazz in Marciac started in France (July 28 – August 17).

August
 17 – The 6th Brecon Jazz Festival started in Brecon, Wales (April 17 – 19).

September
 15 – The 32nd Monterey Jazz Festival started in Monterey, California (September 15 – 17).

Album releases

Abdullah Ibrahim: Blues for a Hip King
Abdullah Ibrahim: African River
Marty Ehrlich: Traveller's Tale
Tim Berne: Fractured Fairy Tales
Joe Maneri: Kalavinka
Henry Threadgill: Rag, Bush and All
16-17: When All Else Fails
Joe Lovano: Worlds
Nimal: Nimal
John Oswald: Plunderphonics
Michael Shrieve: Stiletto
Dave Holland: Extensions
Andrew Hill: Eternal Spirit
Christy Doran: Phoenix
Henry Kaiser: Re-Marrying For Money
Michael Shrieve: Big Picture
Muhal Richard Abrams: Hearinga Suite
Don Pullen: Song Everlasting 
Fred Hersh: Heartsongs
Geri Allen: Twylight 
Leni Stern: Closer to the Light
Ganelin Trio: Cantabile 
Marty Fogel: Many Bobbing Heads 
London Jazz Composers Orchestra:Harmos 
Montreaux: Let Them Say
No Safety: This Lost Leg
John Carter: Shadows on a Wall
Ralph Peterson: Triangular
Ray Anderson: Blues Bred
King Ubu Orchestru: Binaurality
Evan Parker: Conic Sections
Dewey Redman: Living on the Edge
Charles Earland: Third Degree Burn
John Scofield: Time on My Hands
Roy Hargrove: Diamond in the Rough
Tom Harrell: Sail Away
Tommy Flanagan: Jazz Poet
Larry Carlton: On Solid Ground
Neal Schon:Late Nite
Egberto Gismonti: Dança Dos Escravos
Chick Corea Akoustic Band: Chick Corea Akoustic Band
Joe Sample: Spellbound
Eliane Elias: So Far So Close
Pat Metheny Group: Letter From Home
Hugh Masekela: Uptownship

Deaths

 February
 26 – Roy Eldridge, American trumpeter (born 1911).

 March
 24 – Arnett Cobb, American tenor saxophonist (born 1918).

 April
 4 – Roberto Nicolosi, Italian upright bassist and leader (born 1914).
 12 – Herbert Mills, American singer, Mills Brothers (born 1912).

 May
 10 – Woody Shaw, American trumpeter (kidney failure) (born 1944).
 26 – Phineas Newborn, Jr., American pianist (born 1931).

 July
 15 – Will Bradley, American trombonist and bandleader (born 1912).

 October
 19 – Alan Murphy, English guitarist (born 1953).

 November
 5 – Lu Watters, American trumpeter and band leader, Yerba Buena Jazz Band (born 1911).
 9 – Kenny Hagood, American singer (born 1926).
 18 – Freddie Waits, American drummer (born 1943).

 December
 28 – Fred Lange-Nielsen, Norwegian bassist and vocalist (born 1919).

Births

 January
 4 – Trond Bersu, Norwegian drummer and vocalist.

 May
 8 – Christian Skår Winther, Norwegian guitarist.
 24 – Francesco Cafiso, Italian alto saxophonist. 

 June
 6 – Kristoffer Eikrem, Norwegian trumpeter, composer and photographer.

 July
 14 – Isaiah Sharkey, American guitarist and singer.

 August
 28 – Cécile McLorin Salvant, American singer.

 October
 27 – Jakob Terjesønn Rypdal, Norwegian guitarist.

 November
 2 – Isfar Sarabski, Azerbaijani pianist and composer.
 20 – Magnus Skavhaug Nergaard, Norwegian upright bassist.

 December
 11 – KeyLiza or Kesita Elizabeth Massamba, German singer, dancer, DJ, composer and beatmaker.

 Unknown date
 James Mainwaring, English composer, saxophonist, and bandleader.

See also

 1980s in jazz
 List of years in jazz
 1989 in music

References

External links 
 History Of Jazz Timeline: 1989 at All About Jazz

Jazz
Jazz by year